Protein BEX3 is a protein that in humans is encoded by the NGFRAP1 gene.

Interactions 

NGFRAP1 has been shown to interact with YWHAE and Low affinity nerve growth factor receptor.

References

Further reading